Camaron Cheeseman (born April 26, 1998) is an American football long snapper for the Washington Commanders of the National Football League (NFL). He played college football at Michigan and was drafted by Washington in the sixth round of the 2021 NFL Draft.

Career
Cheeseman was ranked as a three-star recruit by 247Sports.com coming out of Lincoln High School in Gahanna, Ohio. He committed to Michigan on December 17, 2015. Cheeseman was drafted by the Washington Football Team in the sixth round (225th overall) of the 2021 NFL Draft. He signed his four-year rookie contract on May 13, 2021.

Personal life
Cheeseman plans to study dentistry at Ohio State University once his NFL career is over. He took the Dental Admission Test at Columbus State Community College and scored in the 92nd percentile. Cheeseman was previously a research assistant in the field while at Michigan, where he co-authored a research paper on an orthodontic appliance for fixing underbites.

References

External links

Washington Commanders bio
Michigan Wolverines bio

1998 births
Living people
American football long snappers
Michigan Wolverines football players
People from New Albany, Ohio
Players of American football from Ohio
Washington Commanders players
Washington Football Team players